The Otay River is a river in southern San Diego County, California. The  river begins at San Miguel Mountain, flows through the Upper and Lower Otay Reservoirs, and continues on between the southern part of the Chula Vista and the Otay Mesa West district of San Diego, to its river mouth on San Diego Bay.

River
The river has a  watershed. To its north is the watershed of Sweetwater River, and to its south is the watershed of Tijuana River. Between Interstate 5 and Interstate 805 is Otay Valley Regional Park. , there is a plan to restore part of its pre-Mexican era estuary on lands utilized by the South Bay Salt Works.

Otay Reservoirs
Savage Dam, completed in 1921, forms the  Lower Otay Reservoir, which is used to supply drinking water to parts of southern San Diego County. The reservoir is also the terminus for Pipeline 3 of the Second San Diego Aqueduct, which delivers water from the Colorado River via the Colorado River Aqueduct. Its predecessor, the Lower Otay Dam was a "rockhill type", which was completed in 1897; it failed in 1916 following heavy rains.

The Upper Otay Reservoir is formed by Upper Otay Dam, built in 1901. The reservoir was established as a hatchery for the introduction of Florida-strain largemouth bass in 1959. The reservoir was chemically treated first, which killed all of the native fish. In 1996, the reservoir was opened to fishing, but all fish caught must be released.

Since the river is used as a municipal water supply, there is no human contact allowed at either of the Otay Reservoirs.

Early testing of manned gliders by noted aviator John J. Montgomery occurred in the region in the late 19th century.

References

Further reading
 
 
 Otay River Watershed Management Plan. San Diego County, Accessed 2011-01-28

Rivers of San Diego County, California
San Diego Bay watershed
Chula Vista, California
Geography of San Diego
San Ysidro Mountains
South Bay (San Diego County)
Rivers of Southern California